Steady On: 30th Anniversary Acoustic Edition is a studio album from American folk music Shawn Colvin, released in 2019 and made up of re-recording from her debut album Steady On.

Recording and release
Colvin decided to re-record her debut album after her manager had suggested how Rodney Crowell had successefully recorded acoustic versions of his songs. She promoted the re-release while on a tour with Mary Chapin Carpenter in 2019. Colvin also wanted to present the music as she originally conceived and heard it herself, recording the tracks with guitar and vocals together, live in studio.

Reception
Linday Fahey of Folk Alley considers the re-recordings to be full of "incredibly expressive guitar backing her utterly emotive voice", which showcases the strength of the songwriting. Tim Martin of Americana UK considers this release a more "timeless setting" for the songs than the 1980s sound of production on the original release of Steady On; his review rates this album seven out of 10. A Glide Magazine review calls several tracks "exemplary, authentic jewels of Americana" that are expressed by the stripped-down re-recording. PopMatters notes that listeners "can hear the true majesty of the material and witness the full range of her formidable creative powers" on this new album.

Track listing
All songs written by Shawn Colvin and John Leventhal, except where noted:
"Steady On" – 5:04
"Diamond in the Rough" – 4:33
"Shotgun Down the Avalanche" – 4:54
"Stranded" (Colvin) – 4:35
"Another Long One" (Colvin) – 4:23
"Cry Like an Angel" – 4:43
"Something to Believe In" – 3:45
"The Story" – 4:08
"Ricochet in Time" (Colvin) – 3:30
"The Dead of the Night" (Colvin) – 5:00

Personnel
Shawn Colvin – acoustic guitar, vocals
Chris Allgood – assistant mastering
Jordan Fann – art direction
Emily Lazar – mastering at The Lodge, New York
Jacob Sciba – recording
Deidre Schoo – photography
LaRon Stewart – art direction
Simon Tassano – mixing at Rumiville Studio

See also
List of 2019 albums

References

External links

Review from Nashville.com
Interview with The Bluegrass Situation

2019 albums
Shawn Colvin albums